Phannapa Harnsujin (born 14 September 1997) is a Thai taekwondo practitioner. She won a gold and a silver medal at the Southeast Asian Games in 2013 and 2015, respectively, and competed in the 57 kg division at the 2016 Summer Olympics. She dedicated her 2013 gold medal to her father, who died in an accident earlier that year.

In 2021, she competed at the 2021 Asian Taekwondo Olympic Qualification Tournament held in Amman, Jordan hoping to qualify for the 2020 Summer Olympics in Tokyo, Japan.

References

External links

1997 births
Living people
Phannapa Harnsujin
Phannapa Harnsujin
Taekwondo practitioners at the 2016 Summer Olympics
Southeast Asian Games medalists in taekwondo
Phannapa Harnsujin
Phannapa Harnsujin
Taekwondo practitioners at the 2018 Asian Games
Competitors at the 2013 Southeast Asian Games
Competitors at the 2015 Southeast Asian Games
Phannapa Harnsujin
World Taekwondo Championships medalists
Competitors at the 2019 Southeast Asian Games
Phannapa Harnsujin
Asian Taekwondo Championships medalists
Phannapa Harnsujin